Illusions is the third solo album by former Misfits vocalist Michale Graves. It is a collaborative album between Graves and West Memphis Three
member Damien Echols, featuring written content and backing vocals from Echols. The album was produced in part due to an early example of a successful crowdfunding campaign, and the contributors' names are printed inside the CD booklet.

Track listing

2007 albums
Michale Graves albums
West Memphis Three